Never Sold Out is a live double album by Japanese rock band Luna Sea, released on their 10th anniversary, May 29, 1999. It compiles live recordings spanning their career up to that point, from 1991 to 1998. The album reached number five on the Oricon Albums Chart, and charted for six weeks. In June 1999, it was certified Gold by the RIAJ for sales over 200,000.

Track listing

References 

Luna Sea albums
1999 live albums
Albums recorded at the Nippon Budokan
Albums recorded at the Tokyo Dome